KONK was an American band formed in 1980 in New York City that emerged during a period marked by the post-punk/new wave and disco scenes which were prevalent at the time. KONK won the attention of both scenes by playing a hybrid of the two musical styles which involved the blending of a new wave attitude with the carefree nature of disco's dance crowd. KONK's musical influences ranged from Afrobeat, jazz and funk to hip hop. Given these influence KONK's style is noted as being highly percussive, and containing simple, yet strong, backing bass lines. As part of New York’s post-punk dance scene they regularly played alongside groups such as Liquid Liquid, Bush Tetras, ESG, the Peech Boys and the Lounge Lizards. They are featured in a book by David Byrne and others on the New York post-punk scene.

Members 
KONK was formed by avant-garde jazz personality Dana Vlcek and had among its many members: Richard Edson, who also played drums on the first Sonic Youth record and has had acting roles in such films as Spike Lee's Do the Right Thing and Jim Jarmusch's Stranger Than Paradise; Angel Quinones on congas, who later played for Jimmy Buffett; another member was Shannon Dawson (trumpet), who also was an early associate of Jean-Michel Basquiat in the band Gray, and the SAMO graffiti, and who did some of the band's promo poster art work. He is the uncle of actress Rosario Dawson. Geordie Gillespie plays drums and percussion, co produced the songs, and is the band archivist. After twenty years as a major label executive, he founded the marketing and management company, Unleashed Music. The band was managed by Ken Sitz, now creative director of Conelrad.

Discography

Albums
 Yo! (1983), Les Disques Du Crépuscule
 Jams (1988), Dog Brothers Records
 KONK: The Definitive Collection (10-song digital release, 2008), Unleashed Music
 KONK Live at CBGB (November 6, 1981) (8-song digital release, 2009), Unleashed Music

Compilations
 The Sound of KONK (Tales of the New York Underground 1981-88) (2004), Soul Jazz

Compilation appearances
 New York Noise - "Baby Dee" (2003), Soul Jazz

Singles and EPs
 "Soka-Loka-Moki" (1981), Konk Organization, distributed by 99 Records
 Konk Party (4 tracks) (1982), Les Disques Du Crépuscule/Interference
 Konk Party (4 tracks) (1983), Celluloid
 "Your Life" (1984), Sleeping Bag
 Your Life (4 tracks) (1984), Sleeping Bag
 "Love Attack" (1986), Dog Brothers Records
 "Machine" (1987), Dog Brothers Records

Billboard charting releases
 "Your Life" - No. 5 Dance (August 11, 1984)
 KONK Jams LP Cuts - No. 30 (May 7, 1988)

Usage in film
 Bright Lights Big City - dir. James Bridges, song - "Love Attack"
 Broken Embraces - dir. Pedro Almodóvar, song - "Your Life"
 Jean-Michel Basquiat: The Radiant Child - dir. Tamra Davis, song - "Your Life"

External links
 Official website

References 

Musical groups established in 1980
Musical groups from New York City
No wave groups
Funk rock musical groups
Dance-rock musical groups
Rough Trade Records artists
Sleeping Bag Records artists
Factory Records artists